Adrian Mark Burnside (born 15 March 1977) is an Australian former baseball player born in Alice Springs.

He was a member of the Australian Olympic baseball team, which achieved a silver medal in the baseball tournament at the 2004 Summer Olympics in Athens. He later played for the Lamigo Monkeys in the Chinese Professional Baseball League in Taiwan.

Early years
In 1995, Burnside was selected for the Australian national junior baseball team to compete in the World Junior Baseball Championship held in Cape Cod, Massachusetts. There he helped his team to win its fifth bronze medal, racking up three wins.

Minor league career
During his Minor league baseball career he played under the Los Angeles Dodgers at Rookie, A-A and AA level, Pittsburgh Pirates at AA level, Detroit Tigers AA and AAA level, Toronto Blue Jays at AAA level, and the San Diego Padres at AA and AAA level.

External links 
, or NPB, or CPBL
 
 Profile and stats from KBO official website
 
 
 

1977 births
Living people
Adelaide Bite players
Altoona Curve players
Australian expatriate baseball players in Japan
Australian expatriate baseball players in Mexico
Australian expatriate baseball players in South Korea
Australian expatriate baseball players in Taiwan
Australian expatriate baseball players in the United States
Baseball players at the 2004 Summer Olympics
Erie SeaWolves players
Great Falls Dodgers players
Jacksonville Suns players
KBO League pitchers
Lamigo Monkeys players
Medalists at the 2004 Summer Olympics
Mexican League baseball pitchers
Kiwoom Heroes players
Nippon Professional Baseball pitchers
Olympic baseball players of Australia
Olympic medalists in baseball
Olympic silver medalists for Australia
Petroleros de Minatitlán players
People from Alice Springs
Portland Beavers players
San Bernardino Stampede players
San Antonio Missions players
Sportsmen from the Northern Territory
Syracuse SkyChiefs players
Toledo Mud Hens players
Yomiuri Giants players
Yakima Bears players
2006 World Baseball Classic players